Aucha is a genus of moths of the family Noctuidae.

Description
Its eyes are naked and without lashes. The proboscis is well developed. Palpi upturned and smoothly scaled, where the second joint reaching above vertex of head, and third joint short. Antennae simple. Thorax and abdomen without tufts and smoothly scaled. Tibia spineless. Forewings with non-crenulate cilia and hindwings produced at apex.

Species
 Aucha melaleuca Berio, 1940
 Aucha polyphaenoides (Wiltshire, 1961)
 Aucha tenebricosa (Saalmüller, 1891)
 Aucha triphaenoides Walker, 1865
 Aucha velans Walker, [1858]
 Aucha vesta Swinhoe, 1901

References

 
 

Amphipyrinae